Illawarra Road is a bypass road in the north of the Australian state of Tasmania. It connects the Midland Highway (N1) in Perth with the Bass Highway (N1) and the Meander Valley Highway (B54), bypassing the city of Launceston.

Route
The road branches off the Midland Highway to the west in Perth, about 15 km south of Launceston. The Cressy Road (B51) joins Longford and the Illawarra Road crosses the South Esk River. Then it continues its way on the west bank of the river to the northwest and is connected to the Bass Highway and the Meander Valley Road just before the mouth of the river in Lake Trevallyn, about 13 km southwest of Launceston.

References

Northern Tasmania
Roads in Tasmania